Murnau station is a railway station in the municipality of Murnau am Staffelsee, located in the Garmisch-Partenkirchen district in Bavaria, Germany. It is located on the Munich–Garmisch-Partenkirchen railway of Deutsche Bahn.

Services
 the following services stop at Murnau:

 RB:

References

External links
 
 Murnau layout 
 

Railway stations in Bavaria
Buildings and structures in Garmisch-Partenkirchen (district)
Railway stations in Germany opened in 1879
1879 establishments in Bavaria